Lavar Glover (born December 17, 1978) is a former American football defensive back. Most recently, Glover served as the head coach and general manager of the Dayton Sharks of the Continental Indoor Football League (CIFL). He went to the University of Cincinnati and was drafted by the Pittsburgh Steelers (7th round, 212th overall) in the 2002 NFL Draft. The Steelers released Glover and he was subsequently signed by the Cincinnati Bengals onto their practice squad. He played 2 games with the Bengals in 2002 and spent time with the Detroit Lions and Denver Broncos. In 2004, he played with the Columbus Destroyers and Orlando Predators of the Arena Football League (AFL). There, Glover had 2 interceptions, 40 tackles and 3 pass knockdowns. The BC Lions signed him as a free agent in 2006. Lavar Glover had 2 interceptions and 29 tackles as part of the 2006 Grey Cup champion Lions team. Now is a sub and in school suspension teacher at kettering middle school Ohio.

On February 25, 2010, Glover was released by the BC Lions. On March 11, 2010, it was announced that Glover had been signed by the Winnipeg Blue Bombers.

References

External links
Lavar Glover at CFL.ca

1978 births
Living people
American football cornerbacks
American players of Canadian football
BC Lions players
Canadian football defensive backs
Cincinnati Bearcats football players
Cincinnati Bengals players
Columbus Destroyers players
Edmonton Elks players
Orlando Predators players
Players of American football from Dayton, Ohio
Players of Canadian football from Dayton, Ohio

 

Now is a sub and in school suspension teacher at kettering middle school Ohio.